Duke Jian of Qi (died 481 BC) was from 484 to 481 BC ruler of the State of Qi, a major power during the Spring and Autumn period of ancient China.  His personal name was Lü Ren (呂壬), ancestral name Jiang (姜), and Duke Jian was his posthumous title.

Reign
Duke Jian succeeded his father, Duke Dao of Qi, who was killed in 485 BC after four years of reign.  Duke Jian made his trusted official Kan Zhi (闞止), a native of the neighbouring State of Lu, his prime minister.  In 481 BC Kan Zhi plotted to attack and expel the powerful Tian clan from Qi, but the Tians learned of his plan and staged a preemptive coup d'etat.  Kan Zhi was killed first, and Duke Jian escaped the capital but was captured in Shuzhou (in present-day Teng County, Shandong) and killed on the 24th day of the fifth month.

Tian Heng, the leader of the Tian clan, subsequently installed Duke Jian's younger brother Ao on the throne, to be known as Duke Ping of Qi.  From then on the dukes of Qi would be reduced to mere figureheads and the leaders of the Tian clan would be de facto rulers of Qi, and in 386 BC Tian He would formally become Duke of Qi, ending more than six centuries of rule by the House of Jiang.

Ancestry

References

Year of birth unknown
Monarchs of Qi (state)
5th-century BC Chinese monarchs
481 BC deaths
5th-century BC murdered monarchs
Assassinated Chinese politicians